Certisign Certificadora Digital S.A. is a Brazilian company based in São Paulo that provides public key infrastructure (PKI) products to financial institutions, governments, and enterprises. Certisign also provides a variety of security and consulting services ranging from digital certificates, authentication, and managed Digital Identity.

History
In 1995, two Brazilian information technology professionals, Paulo Wollny and Eduardo Rosemberg, founded the company. In 1996, the company established itself as a certificate authority after it received an investment . In 2000 Certisign became the exclusive Brazilian affiliate of VeriSign.

In 2004, Certisign acquired KMS Software, an identity management provider. As at 2009 Certisign had about 1,500,000 certificates in operation, making it the largest CA in Brazil at that time.

Products and services
Certisign’s products and services are mostly in the field of public key infrastructure platforms. They issue digital certificates that are used for authentication of Web sites, as well as users on internal networks through their Identity Management System. Certisign’s IMS has the ability to integrate with Microsoft Active directory.

References

Companies based in São Paulo